Terreulactone A is a meroterpenoid isolate of Aspergillus with anti-acetylcholinesterase activity.

References

Biomolecules
Aspergillus compounds
Heterocyclic compounds with 5 rings
Lactones
Oxygen heterocycles
Methoxy compounds